Haworthia lockwoodii is a species of succulent plant in the genus Haworthia.  Native to the Cape Province of South Africa, it was named for a local magistrate.

Among Haworthia species H. lockwoodii  is unusual in appearance during the dormant phase that it enters in times of drought; the external leaves dry out more or less, and lose their turgor. The wilted leaves often cover the plant entirely, which then appears to be almost dead. During the wet season, this leaf cover absorbs water rapidly, becoming turgid and pale green. As shown in the illustrations, the shape and colour of the turgid leaves also show that the species is a window plant: its leaf tips have panels that are practically colourless and transparent, admitting light to the chloroplasts deep inside.

References

External links
 Blog post describing the species in detail
 

lockwoodii
Flora of South Africa
Plants described in 1940